The Mysterious Affair at Styles is the first detective novel by British writer Agatha Christie, introducing her fictional detective  Hercule Poirot. It was written in the middle of the First World War, in 1916, and first published by John Lane in the United States in October 1920 and in the United Kingdom by The Bodley Head (John Lane's UK company) on 21 January 1921.

Styles introduced Poirot, Inspector (later, Chief Inspector) Japp, and Arthur Hastings. Poirot, a Belgian refugee of the Great War, is settling in England near the home of Emily Inglethorp, who helped him to his new life. His friend Hastings arrives as a guest at her home. When Mrs Inglethorp is murdered, Poirot uses his detective skills to solve the mystery.

The book includes maps of the house, the murder scene, and a drawing of a fragment of a will. The true first publication of the novel was as a weekly serial in The Times, including the maps of the house and other illustrations included in the book. This novel was one of the first ten books published by Penguin Books when it began in 1935.

Styles was well received by reviewers in the UK and the US at initial publication. An analysis in 1990 was positive about the plot, considered the novel one of the few by Christie that is well-anchored in time and place, a story that knows it describes the end of an era, and mentions that the plot is clever. Christie had not mastered cleverness throughout her first novel, as "too many clues tend to cancel each other out"; this was judged a difficulty "which Conan Doyle never satisfactorily overcame, but which Christie would."

The story features many of the elements that have become icons of the Golden Age of Detective Fiction, largely due to Christie's influence. It is set in a large, isolated country manor. There are a half-dozen suspects, most of whom are hiding facts about themselves. The plot includes a number of red herrings and surprise twists.

The Mysterious Affair at Styles launched Christie's writing career.  Christie and her husband subsequently named their house "Styles". Hercule Poirot would go on to become one of the most famous characters in fiction.  Decades later, when Christie told the story of Poirot's final case in Curtain, she set that novel at Styles.

Composition and original publication
Agatha Christie began working on The Mysterious Affair at Styles in 1916, writing most of it on Dartmoor.  The character of Hercule Poirot was inspired by her experience working as a nurse, ministering to Belgian soldiers during the First World War, and by Belgian refugees who were living in Torquay.

The manuscript was rejected by Hodder and Stoughton and Methuen.  Christie then submitted the manuscript to The Bodley Head.  After keeping the submission for several months, The Bodley Head's founder, John Lane, offered to accept it, provided that Christie make slight changes to the ending.  She revised the next-to-last chapter, changing the scene of Poirot's grand revelation from a courtroom to the Styles library. (Some modern editions of the published book also include an appendix with the original "unpublished" alternative ending set in the courtroom. It is very similar to the final version in content, with dialogue from other characters replaced by dialogue from the Judge and Sir Ernest Heavywether.) Christie later stated that the contract she signed with Lane was exploitative.

The Mysterious Affair at Styles was published by John Lane in the United States in October 1920 and by The Bodley Head in the United Kingdom on 21 January 1921.  The US edition retailed at $2.00 and the UK edition at seven shillings and sixpence (7/6).

Plot summary
On the morning of 18 July, the household at the country manor of Styles Court wakes to the discovery that Emily Inglethorp, the elderly and wealthy owner, has died. She had been poisoned with strychnine. Arthur Hastings, a soldier from the Western Front staying at Styles as a guest on his sick leave, ventures out to the nearby village of Styles St Mary to enlist help from his friend Hercule Poirot. Emily's household includes her husband, Alfred Inglethorp, a younger man she recently married; her stepsons (from her first husband's previous marriage) John and Lawrence Cavendish; John's wife Mary Cavendish; Cynthia Murdoch, the daughter of a deceased friend of the family; and Evelyn Howard, Emily's companion.

Poirot learns that, on Emily's death, John is to inherit the manor property, in accordance with his father's will. However, her money will be distributed according to her own will, which she changes at least once a year; her most recent will favours Alfred, who will now inherit her fortune. On the day of the murder, Emily had been arguing with someone, suspected to be either Alfred or John. She had been distressed after this and apparently made a new will, but no one can find any evidence of the new will. Alfred left the manor early that evening and stayed overnight in the village. Meanwhile, Emily ate little at dinner and retired early to her room, taking her document case with her; when her body was found, the case had been forced open. Nobody can explain how or when the poison was administered to her.

Inspector Japp, the investigating officer, considers Alfred to be the prime suspect, as he gains the most from his wife's death. Poirot notes that Alfred's behaviour is suspicious during the investigation. He refuses to provide an alibi and denies purchasing the strychnine in the village, despite evidence to the contrary. Although Japp is keen to arrest him, Poirot intervenes by proving he could not have purchased the poison; the signature for the purchase is not in his handwriting. Suspicion now falls on John, next to gain from Emily's will and without an alibi for the murder. Japp soon arrests him: the signature for the poison is in his handwriting; a phial that contained the poison is found in his room; a false beard and a pair of pince-nez identical to Alfred's are found within the manor.

Poirot's investigations exonerate John of the crime. He establishes that the murder was committed by Alfred Inglethorp, with aid from his cousin Evelyn Howard. The pair pretended to be enemies but were romantically involved. They added bromide to Emily's regular evening medicine, obtained from her sleeping powder, making the final dose lethal. The pair then left false evidence that would incriminate Alfred, which they knew would be refuted at his trial; once acquitted, he could not be tried for the crime again if genuine evidence against him was found, under the law of double jeopardy. The pair framed John as part of their plan; Evelyn forged his handwriting, and the evidence against him was fabricated.

Poirot explains that he prevented Japp from arresting Alfred because Poirot could see that Alfred wanted to be arrested. Thanks to a chance remark by Hastings, Poirot finds a letter in Emily's room that detailed Alfred's intentions for Evelyn. Emily's distress on the afternoon of the murder was because she had found this letter in Alfred's desk while searching for stamps. Emily's document case was forced open by Alfred when he realised she had the letter. He then hid the letter elsewhere in the room to avoid being found with it.

Characters
 Hercule Poirot – Renowned Belgian private detective. He lives in England after being displaced by the war in Europe. Asked to investigate the case by his old friend Hastings.
 Hastings – Poirot's friend, and the narrator of the story. He is a guest at Styles Court while on sick leave from the Western Front.
 Inspector Japp – A Scotland Yard detective, and the investigating officer. He is an acquaintance of Poirot at the time of the novel's setting.
 Emily Inglethorp – A wealthy old woman, and the wife of Alfred Inglethorp. She inherited her fortune and her home of Styles Court following the death of her first husband, Mr Cavendish. She is the victim of the case.
 Alfred Inglethorp – Emily's second husband and 20 years younger than she is. Considered by her family to be a spoiled fortune-hunter.
 John Cavendish – Emily's elder stepson, from her first husband's previous marriage, and the brother of Lawrence. John formerly practised as a barrister and has known Hastings for many years. It is he who invites Hastings to Styles near the beginning of the story. He is going through some issues with his marriage to his wife Mary.
 Mary Cavendish – John's wife, and a friend of Dr Bauerstein.
 Lawrence Cavendish – Emily's younger stepson, from her first husband's previous marriage, and the brother of John. Known to have studied medicine and qualified as a doctor.
 Evelyn Howard – Emily's companion, and a second cousin of Alfred Inglethorp, of whom she nevertheless expresses a strong dislike.
 Cynthia Murdoch – The daughter of a deceased friend of the family, an orphan. She performs war-time work at a nearby hospital's dispensary.
 Dr Bauerstein – A well-known toxicologist, living not far from Styles.
 Dorcas – A maid at Styles. Loyal to Mrs Inglethorp.

Dedication

The book's dedication reads: "To my Mother".

Christie's mother, Clarissa ("Clara") Boehmer Miller (1854–1926), was a strong influence on her life and someone to whom Christie was extremely close, especially after the death of her father in 1901. It was while Christie was ill (circa 1908) that her mother suggested she write a story. The result was The House of Beauty, now a lost work, which hesitantly started her writing career. Christie later revised this story as The House of Dreams, and it was published in issue 74 of The Sovereign Magazine in January 1926 and, many years later, in 1997, in book form in While the Light Lasts and Other Stories.

Christie also dedicated her debut novel as Mary Westmacott, Giant's Bread (1930), to her mother who, by that time, had died.

Literary significance and reception
The Times Literary Supplement (3 February 1921) gave the book an enthusiastic, if short, review, which stated: "The only fault this story has is that it is almost too ingenious." It went on to describe the basic set-up of the plot and concluded: "It is said to be the author's first book, and the result of a bet about the possibility of writing a detective story in which the reader would not be able to spot the criminal. Every reader must admit that the bet was won."

The New York Times Book Review (26 December 1920), was also impressed:

The novel's review in The Sunday Times of 20 February 1921, quoted the publisher's promotional blurb concerning Christie writing the book as the result of a bet that she would not be able to do so without the reader being able to guess the murderer, then said, "Personally we did not find the "spotting" so very difficult, but we are free to admit that the story is, especially for a first adventure in fiction, very well contrived, and that the solution of the mystery is the result of logical deduction. The story, moreover, has no lack of movement, and the several characters are well drawn."

The contributor who wrote his column under the pseudonym of "A Man of Kent" in the 10 February 1921 issue of the Christian newspaper The British Weekly praised the novel but was overly generous in giving away the identity of the murderers. To wit,

The Bodley Head quoted excerpts from this review in future books by Christie but, understandably, did not use those passages which gave away the identity of the culprits.

"Introducing Hercule Poirot, the brilliant – and eccentric – detective who, at a friend's request, steps out of retirement – and into the shadows of a classic mystery on the outskirts of Essex. The victim is the wealthy mistress of Styles Court, found in her locked bedroom with the name of her late husband on her dying lips. Poirot has a few questions for her fortune-hunting new spouse, her aimless stepsons, her private doctor, and her hired companion. The answers are positively poisonous. Who's responsible, and why, can only be revealed by the master detective himself." (Book jacket, Berkley Book edition April 1984)

In his book, A Talent to Deceive – An Appreciation of Agatha Christie, Robert Barnard wrote:

In the "Binge!" article of Entertainment Weekly Issue #1343-44 (26 December 2014–3 January 2015), the writers picked The Mysterious Affair at Styles as an "EW favorite" on the list of the "Nine Great Christie Novels".

Adaptations

Television

British

The Mysterious Affair at Styles was adapted as an episode for the series Agatha Christie's Poirot on 16 September 1990; the episode was specially made by ITV to celebrate the centenary of the author's birth. The cast included David Suchet as Hercule Poirot, Hugh Fraser as Lieutenant Arthur Hastings and Philip Jackson as Inspector James Japp. It was filmed at Chavenage House in Gloucestershire, England. The adaptation was generally faithful to Christie's story, although there were a number of deviations from it. The introduction of Poirot is greatly extended, including scenes of Poirot interrupting a military exercise, singing "It's a Long Way to Tipperary" with the Belgian refugees, and advising the post office of a better way to organize their products by country of origin. The adaptation also provided further elaboration on Hastings' first meeting with Poirot – the pair met during an investigation into a shooting, in which Hastings was a suspect.

Latvian

The novel was adapted as a TV miniseries for Latvijas Televīzija, titled "Slepkavība Stailzā". It was broadcast over 3 nights in 1990. The cast included  as Puaro (Poirot's name in Latvian) and Romāns Birmanis as Hastingss (Hastings). Being a miniseries, with a total runtime of approximately 198 minutes, it included many details from the novel that were omitted from other shorter adaptations, and was generally faithful to the novel. One difference from the novel is that the inquest hearing is omitted, and instead there are more scenes from Džaps and Samerhejs (Japp and Summerhaye) searching for clues at Styles Court. Also, the ending sequence follows Christie's original unpublished version, where Poirot makes his final revelations in the courtroom.

French

It was adapted for an episode of Les Petits Meurtres d'Agatha Christie, which was broadcast in 2016. The series stars Samuel Labarthe as Swan Laurence, who replaces the character of Poirot in this adaptation. This version has many differences from the novel, but the core story is the same: a wealthy old woman is murdered by her husband together with her top business partner, who appear to hate each other but are secretly lovers. Certain aspects from the novel are retained, such as a disguise used to buy the poison with Eve Constantin (the character equivalent to Evelyn Howard) impersonating Adrien Sauvignac (the equivalent of Alfred Inglethorp), and the latter's deliberate attempt to get himself arrested so that he can produce his alibi. In this adaptation, Styles Court is a beauty spa instead of a country house.

Radio
The novel was adapted for radio by Michael Bakewell as a five-part serial in 2005, as part of the Hercule Poirot radio series for BBC Radio 4. The cast included John Moffatt as Poirot and Simon Williams as Captain Hastings. Inspector Japp was played by Philip Jackson, who had played the same role in the British television adaptation. The serial was broadcast weekly from 5 September to 3 October. All five episodes were recorded on 4 April 2005 at Bush House. This version retained the first-person narration by the character of Hastings.

Stage
On 14 February 2012, Great Lakes Theater in Cleveland, Ohio debuted a 65-minute stage adaptation as part of their educational programming. Adapted by David Hansen, this production is performed by a cast of five (3 men, 2 women) with most performers playing more than one role.

On 17 March 2016, the Hedgerow Theatre company in Media, Pennsylvania, premiered an adaptation by Jared Reed. While largely faithful to the novel, the character of Inspector Japp was omitted.

Publication history
 1920, John Lane (New York), October 1920, Hardcover, 296 pp
 1920, National Book Company, Hardcover, 296 pp
 1921, John Lane (The Bodley Head), 21 January 1921, Hardcover, 296 pp
 1926, John Lane (The Bodley Head), June 1926, Hardcover (Cheap edition – two shillings) 319 pp
 1931, John Lane (The Bodley Head), February 1931 (As part of the Agatha Christie Omnibus along with The Murder on the Links and Poirot Investigates), Hardcover, Priced at seven shillings and sixpence; a cheaper edition at five shillings was published in October 1932
 1932, John Lane (The Bodley Head), July 1932, Paperback (ninepence)
 1935, Penguin Books, 30 July 1935, Paperback (sixpence), 255 pp
 1945, Avon Books (New York), Avon number 75, Paperback, 226 pp
 1954, Pan Books, Paperback (Pan number 310), 189 pp
 1959, Pan Books, Paperback (Great Pan G112)
 1961, Bantam Books (New York), Paperback, 154 pp
 1965, Longman (London), Paperback, 181 pp
 1976, Dodd, Mead and Company, (Commemorative Edition following Christie's death), Hardback, 239 pp; 
 1984, Berkley Books (New York, Division of Penguin Putnam), Paperback, 198 pp; 
 1988, Fontana Books (Imprint of HarperCollins), Paperback, 208 pp; 
 1989, Ulverscroft Large Print Edition, Hardcover; 
 2007, Facsimile of 1921 UK first edition (HarperCollins), 5 November 2007, Hardcover, 296 pp; 
 2018, Srishti Publishers & Distributors, Paperback, 186 pp; 

Additional editions are listed at Fantastic Fiction, including
29 Hardcover editions from 1958 to September 2010 ( / 9781169289864 Publisher: Kessinger Publishing)
107 Paperback editions from 1970 to September 2013 ( / 9780007527496 (UK edition) Publisher: Harper)
30 Audio editions from September 1994 to June 2013 ( / 9781470887711 Publisher: Blackstone Audiobooks)
96 Kindle editions from December 2001 to November 2013 (ISBN B008BIGEHG).

The novel received its first true publication as an eighteen-part serialisation in The Times newspaper's Weekly Edition (aka The Times Weekly Edition) from 27 February (Issue 2252) to 25 June 1920 (Issue 2269). This version of the novel mirrored the published version with no textual differences and included the maps and illustrations of handwriting examples used in the novel. At the end of the serialisation an advertisement appeared in the newspaper, which announced, "This is a brilliant mystery novel, which has had the unique distinction for a first novel of being serialised in The Times Weekly Edition. Mr John Lane is now preparing a large edition in volume form, which will be ready immediately." Although another line of the advertisement stated that the book would be ready in August, it was first published by John Lane in the United States in October 1920 and was not published in the UK by The Bodley Head until the following year.

The Mysterious Affair at Styles later made publishing history by being one of the first ten books to be published by Penguin Books when they were launched on 30 July 1935. The book was Penguin Number 6.

The blurb on the inside flap of the dustwrapper of the first edition reads:
This novel was originally written as the result of a bet, that the author, who had previously never written a book, could not compose a detective novel in which the reader would not be able to "spot" the murderer, although having access to the same clues as the detective. The author has certainly won her bet, and in addition to a most ingenious plot of the best detective type she has introduced a new type of detective in the shape of a Belgian. This novel has had the unique distinction for a first book of being accepted by the Times as a serial for its weekly edition.

References

External links

The Mysterious Affair at Styles is in the public domain in the US. The copyright on the book will not expire in some Western countries before 2047.
 
 (without the illustrations)
The Mysterious Affair at Styles at the official Agatha Christie website

1920 British novels
Hercule Poirot novels
Works originally published in The Times
Novels first published in serial form
Novels about murder
Novels set in Essex
John Lane (publisher) books
United Kingdom home front during World War I
Novels set during World War I
British novels adapted into television shows
1920 debut novels
Uxoricide in fiction
Works set in country houses
Refugees and displaced people in fiction